Vaceuchelus gotoi is a species of sea snail, a marine gastropod mollusk in the family Chilodontaidae.

Distribution
This marine species occurs off Okinawa.

Original description
 Poppe, G.T. & Tagaro, S.P. (2020). Description of two new trochoidean species from the Okinawa Islands. Visaya. 5 (4): 25-31.

References

gotoi
Gastropods described in 2020